Antonio Armuzzi (born 14 August 1969) is a former Italian male long-distance runner who competed at individual senior level at the IAAF World Half Marathon Championships.

He also won a medal with the national team at the European 10,000m Cup.

References

External links
 

1969 births
Living people
Italian male long-distance runners